Herbivores' effects on plant diversity vary across environmental changes. Herbivores could increase plant diversity or decrease plant diversity. Loss of plant diversity due to climate change can also affect herbivore and plant community relationships

Dominant species effect 
People used to think herbivores increase plant diversity by avoiding dominance. Dominant species tend to exclude subordinate species as competitive exclusion. However, the effects on plant diversity caused by variation in dominance could be beneficial or negative. Herbivores do increase bio-diversity by consuming dominant plant species, but they can also prefer eating subordinate species according to plants’ palatability and quality. Plant palatability also heavily affects which plant species becomes dominant and which becomes subordinate, as palatability is a huge factor in whether herbivores choose to consume a certain plant more or less and hence affects its course of growth. In addition to the preference of herbivores, herbivores' effects on plant diversity are also influenced by other factors, defense trade-off theory, the predator-prey interaction, and inner traits of the environment and herbivores.

Defense trade-off theory effect 
One way that plants could differ in their susceptibility to herbivores is through defense trade-off. Defense trade-off theory is commonly used to be seen as a fundamental theory to maintain ecological evenness. Plants can make a trade-off response to resource allocation, such as between defense and growth. Defenses against herbivores on plant diversity can vary in different situations. It can be neutral, detrimental or beneficial for plant fitness. Defense trade-offs can be used to change plant phenotype based on environmental challenges (such as herbivory). Even in the absence of defensive trade-offs, herbivores may still be able to increase plant diversity, such as herbivores prefer subordinate species rather than dominant species.

The predator-prey interaction, especially the “top-down” regulation. Some of the consequences of high grazing pressure, is that plant productivity is reduced due to photosynthetic tissue removal. Reducing their richness and/or abundance in the ecosystem. This is what we know as the top-down effect that in this case focuses on the herbivore population and plant communities. The predator-prey interaction encourages the adaptation in plant species which the predator prefers. The theory of “top-down” ecological regulation disproportionately manipulates the biomass of dominant species to increase diversity. The herbivore effect on plant is universal but still significantly distinguish on each site, can be positive or negative.

Productivity effect 
In a highly productive system, the environment provides an organism with adequate resources to grow. The effects of herbivores competing for resources on the plant are more complicated. Moderate levels of herbivory can increase the productivity of biomass, including plants. The existence of herbivores can increase plant diversity by reducing the abundance of dominant species, redundant resources then can be used by subordinate species. Therefore, in a highly productive system, direct consumption of dominant plants could indirectly benefit those herbivory-resistant and unpalatable species. But the less productive system can support limited herbivores because of lack of resources. Herbivory boosts the abundance of most tolerant species and decreases the less-tolerant species’ existence which accelerates the plant extinction. Moderate productive system sometimes barely has long-term effects on plant diversity. Because the environment provides a stable coexistence of different organisms. Even when herbivores create some disturbances to the community. The system is still able to recover to the original state.

Light is one of the most important resources in environments for plant species. Competition for light availability and predator avoidance are equally important. With the addition of the resources, more competition arises among plant species. But herbivores can buffer the diversity reduction. Especially large herbivores can enhance the bio-diversity by selectively excluding tall, dominant plant species, and increase light availability.

Body size of herbivores effect 
Body size of herbivores is a key reason underlying the interaction between herbivores and plant diversity, and the body size explains many of the phenomena connected to herbivore-plant interaction. An increase of body size means it requires more nutrients and energy to sustain itself. Small herbivores are less likely to decrease plant diversity. Because small non-digging animals may not cause too many disturbances to the environment. Intermediate-sized herbivores mostly increase plant diversity by consuming or influencing the dominant plant species, such as herbivore birds, that can directly use dominant plant species. While some herbivores enhance plant diversity by indirect effects on plant competition. Some digging animals at this size local community environmental fluctuations. And the adaptation of plant species to avoid predators can also adjust the vegetation structure and increase diversity. Larger herbivores often increase plant diversity. They use competitively dominant plant species, and disperse seeds and create disorder of the soil. Besides, their urine position also adjusts the local plant distribution, and prevent light competition. With a larger body size, large herbivores tend to consume higher-quality and more plants to gain back the required amount of nutrition and energy. Larger herbivores also leave behind larger amounts of fecal matter, which tends to increase the nutrients needed to grow plants in herbivore dominated areas such as grasslands, such as nitrogen and phosphorus.

Therefore, the mechanisms of herbivores’ effects on plant diversity are complicated. Generally, the existence of herbivores increases plant diversity. Moderate herbivore enhances plant productivity as it reduces self-shading and accelerates nutrient cycling. But varies according to different environmental factors, multiple factors combined together to affect how herbivores influence plant diversity.

References

Herbivory
Plant ecology